Heinz Jaeger (born 8 May 1924) is a German philatelist who was added to the Roll of Distinguished Philatelists in 1987. Jaeger is an expert in the philately of Baden. Jaeger was president of the Federation of German Philatelists.

References

1924 births
Living people
German philatelists
Officers Crosses of the Order of Merit of the Federal Republic of Germany
Signatories to the Roll of Distinguished Philatelists